Clinidium crater is a species of ground beetle in the subfamily Rhysodinae. It was described by R.T. Bell & J.R. Bell in 1985. It is known from Cerro Jefe in Panama. Clinidium crater measure  in length.

References

Clinidium
Beetles of Central America
Endemic fauna of Panama
Beetles described in 1985